Martin Neyland (29 September 1877 – 1947), sometimes known as Martin Nalan, was an English professional footballer who played as a forward in the Football League for Bolton Wanderers.

Personal life 
Neyland served in the Territorial Force with the Lancashire Fusiliers prior to the First World War. Shortly after the outbreak of the war in August 1914, he enlisted in the Loyal North Lancashire Regiment. Neyland transferred to the Royal Engineers in February 1917 and held the rank of pioneer.

Career statistics

References 

1877 births
Footballers from Bolton
English footballers
Chatham Town F.C. players
Association football forwards
English Football League players
British Army personnel of World War I
Gillingham F.C. players
Bolton Wanderers F.C. players
Swindon Town F.C. players
Nelson F.C. players
Loyal Regiment soldiers
Lancashire Fusiliers soldiers
Royal Engineers soldiers
Southern Football League players
1947 deaths